was a town located in Nishisonogi District, Nagasaki Prefecture, Japan.

As of 2003, the town had an estimated population of 5,412 and a density of 116.09 persons per km².

On January 4, 2005, Sotome, along with the towns of Iōjima, Kōyagi, Nomozaki, Sanwa and Takashima (all from Nishisonogi District), was merged into the expanded city of Nagasaki and no longer exists as an independent municipality.

International relations

Twin towns — sister cities
Sotome is twinned with:
 Vaux-Sur-Aure, France

References

External links
 Official website of the City of Nagasaki in Japanese (some English content)

Dissolved municipalities of Nagasaki Prefecture